Confluaria japonica is an endoparasitic tapeworm in the family Hymenolepididae. It infects the small intestine of the little grebe and numerous other bird species.

References 

Eucestoda
Parasites of birds
Animals described in 1935